The 2001 UEFA Champions League final was a football match that took place at San Siro in Milan, Italy, on 23 May 2001, to decide the winner of the 2000–01 UEFA Champions League. The match pitted German side Bayern Munich against Spanish side Valencia. The match finished in a 1–1 draw, but Bayern clinched their fourth title by winning 5–4 on penalties. This was also their first European Cup title in a quarter-century, also representing Valencia's second consecutive final defeat (2000 and 2001). As all the goals in the match were scored from penalties, with also Bayern Munich missing a penalty in normal time and a penalty shoot-out was required to decide the winner, this UEFA Champions League match became an "all-penalty" final. The 2001 final was a meeting of the two previous seasons' losing finalists – Bayern Munich lost to Manchester United in 1999 and Valencia lost to Real Madrid in 2000.

This was the sixth European Cup final to be decided on penalties, and the second under the Champions League format. This was Ottmar Hitzfeld's second Champions League title after he won it with Borussia Dortmund in 1997, making him the second coach in European Cup history, after Ernst Happel, to win the competition with two clubs. Meanwhile, it was Héctor Cúper's third consecutive European final defeat; he lost the 1999 UEFA Cup Winners' Cup Final with Mallorca, before losing the 2000 Champions League final with Valencia.

Teams 
In the following table, finals until 1992 were in the European Cup era, since 1993 were in the UEFA Champions League era.

Route to the final

Match

Summary
This final would come to be known for the goalkeeping heroics of Bayern keeper Oliver Kahn.

Valencia opened the score early on with a Gaizka Mendieta penalty in the third minute after a prostrate Patrik Andersson was deemed to have handled the ball in the penalty area. Only a few minutes later, Bayern Munich were awarded a penalty after Jocelyn Angloma fouled Stefan Effenberg in the penalty box, but Santiago Cañizares saved Mehmet Scholl's kick with his legs. Bayern were awarded another penalty early in the second half, this time after Amedeo Carboni handled the ball while competing for a header with Carsten Jancker. This time, Stefan Effenberg took the penalty kick and sent Cañizares the wrong way to level the scores at 1–1. The scores remained level for the remainder of normal time and throughout the 30 minutes of extra time, so the match went to penalties.

Again, Valencia took the lead early on as Paulo Sérgio put the first kick of the shoot-out over the bar before Mendieta sent Oliver Kahn the wrong way. Hasan Salihamidžić, John Carew and Alexander Zickler then traded penalty goals before Kahn saved Zlatko Zahovič's kick to tie the scores at 2–2 after three kicks each. The next kick from Patrik Andersson was also saved by Cañizares, and then Kahn stretched out a hand to tip Amedeo Carboni's shot onto the crossbar. Both Rubén Baraja and Stefan Effenberg then scored to take the shoot-out to sudden death. Bixente Lizarazu and Kily González both scored their clubs' sixth kicks of the penalty shoot-out, and then Thomas Linke scored for Bayern to set Mauricio Pellegrino up for the game-deciding kick. Kahn guessed the right direction and saved Pellegrino's kick, winning the cup for Bayern Munich.

Kahn also won the UEFA Fair Play Award for consoling his heartbroken rival, Valencia's Santiago Cañizares after the penalty shoot-out.

Details

Statistics

See also
2000–01 UEFA Champions League
2001 UEFA Super Cup
2001 Intercontinental Cup
FC Bayern Munich in international football competitions
Valencia CF in European football

References

European Cup Final 2001
European Cup Final 2001
2001
European Cup Final 2001
European Cup Final 2001
European Cup Final 2001
Final
Champions League Final
Champions League Final
May 2001 sports events in Europe
2001 UEFA Champions League Final
Sports competitions in Milan